Amélia Christinat (6 February 1926 at Corticiasca, Ticino – 7 September 2016 in Geneva) was a Swiss politician and women's rights activist. She sat in the National Council from 1978 to 1987 as the first female National Councillor from the canton of Geneva.

Life
Amélia Christinat was born in 1926 at Corticiasca, Ticino in southeastern Switzerland, into a poor family. She was the daughter of boilermaker Eugenio Petrall and of mountain farmer Maria-Maddalena Minuzzi. She was trained as a dressmaker at the vocational school of Lugano. She subsequently worked at Tavaro SA and later as a civil servant at the post cheque office.

In October 1949, she married Emile Christinat, a post administrator who was 17 years older than her. Their daughter Nadia was born in 1955. Emile died in 1994.

Amélia Christinat died from a stroke on September 7, 2016 in Geneva.

Political career
Amélia first campaigned as a trade unionist and as a suffragist. After women's suffrage was introduced in the canton of Geneva in March 1960, Christinat joined the Social Democratic Party of Geneva. She took part to the establishment of the Fédération romande des consommatrices (French-Swiss Consumers' Federation) alongside former syndic of Lausanne Yvette Jaggi to promote the importance of the social and economic role of housewives.

In 1978, she became the first female National Councillor from Geneva, representing the Social Democratic Party. She campaigned for maternity insurance and for a better representation of women in the Federal Assembly. She was nicknamed "la pasionaria" because of her passion.

See also
List of members of the Federal Assembly from the Canton of Geneva
 Women's suffrage in Switzerland

References

External links

20th-century Swiss women
20th-century Swiss women politicians
20th-century Swiss politicians
Social Democratic Party of Switzerland politicians
Women members of the National Council (Switzerland)
Swiss women's rights activists
Swiss suffragists
People from Lugano District
1926 births
2016 deaths